The American University (AU or American) is a private federally chartered research university in Washington, D.C. Its main campus spans 90 acres (36 ha) on Ward Circle, mostly in the Spring Valley neighborhood of Northwest D.C. AU was chartered by an Act of Congress in 1893 at the urging of Methodist bishop John Fletcher Hurst, who sought to create an institution that would promote public service, internationalism, and pragmatic idealism. AU broke ground in 1902, opened as a graduate education institution in 1914, and admitted its first undergraduates in 1925. Although affiliated with the United Methodist Church, religious affiliation is not a criterion for admission.

American University has eight schools and colleges: the School of International Service, College of Arts and Sciences, Kogod School of Business, School of Communication, Professional Studies and Executive Education, School of Public Affairs, School of Education, and the Washington College of Law (WCL). It has over 160 programs, including 71 bachelor's degrees, 87 master's degrees, and 10 doctoral degrees, as well as JD, LLM, and SJD programs. AU's student body numbers over 13,000 and represents all 50 U.S. states and 141 countries; around a fifth of students are international. It is classified among "R2: Doctoral Universities – High research activity".

American University's alumni, faculty, and staff have included two Pulitzer Prize winners, two Nobel Prize winners, one United States Senator, 25 United States Representatives, 18 Ambassadors of the United States, and several foreign heads of state. American University is one of the top five feeder schools to the U.S. Foreign Service, Congressional staff, and other governmental agencies.

The university owns National Public Radio's flagship capital affiliate, WAMU, which has been a source of nationally and internationally distributed programming such as The Diane Rehm Show and the more recent 1A, styled as "the 1A", as in "the 1st Amendment".

History

Founding

The American University was established in the District of Columbia by an Act of Congress on December 5, 1892, primarily due to the efforts of Methodist bishop John Fletcher Hurst, who aimed to create an institution that could train future public servants. Hurst also chose the university's site, which was in the rural periphery of the District. After more than three decades devoted principally to securing financial support, the university was officially dedicated on May 15, 1914, with its first instructions beginning October of that year when 28 students were enrolled, 19 of whom were graduates and the remainder special students not candidates for a degree. The First Commencement, at which no degrees were awarded, was held on June 2, 1915. The Second Annual Commencement was held the following year and saw the awarding of the first degrees: one master's degree and two doctor's degrees. AU admitted both women and African Americans, which was uncommon in higher education at the time. Among its first 28 students were five women, while an African American doctoral student was admitted in 1915.

Shortly after these early commencement ceremonies, classes were interrupted by war. During World War I, the university allowed the U.S. military to use some of its grounds for testing. In 1917, the U.S. military divided American University into two segments, Camp American University and Camp Leach. Camp American University became the birthplace of the United States' chemical weapons program and the site of chemical weapons testing; this required a major cleanup effort in the 1990s. Camp Leach was home to advanced research, development, and testing of modern camouflage techniques. , the Army Corps of Engineers was still removing ordnance including mustard gas and mortar shells.

Instruction was first offered only at the graduate level, in accordance with the plan of the founders. This changed in 1925 with the establishment of the College of Liberal Arts (subsequently named the College of Arts and Sciences), which offered the first undergraduate degrees and programs. What is now the School of Public Affairs was founded in 1934, partly to educate future federal employees in new approaches to public administration introduced by the New Deal; during the event commemorating its launch, President Franklin D. Roosevelt stressed cooperation between the school and his administration.

AU's relationship with the U.S. government continued during World War II, when the campus hosted the U.S. Navy Bomb Disposal School and a WAVE barracks. For AU's role in these wartime efforts, the Victory ship SS American Victory was named in its honor.

Post-war expansion (1949–1990)

The post-war period saw considerable growth and restructuring of AU. In 1947, the Washington Semester Program was established, pioneering the concept of 
semester-long internships in the nation's capital. In 1949, the university merged with the Washington College of Law, which began in 1896 as the first law school founded by women and the first coeducational institution for the professional study of law in the District. Shortly after that, three departments were reorganized as schools: the School of Business Administration in 1955 (subsequently named the Robert P. and Arlene R. Kogod College of Business Administration and in 1999 renamed the Kogod School of Business); the School of Government and Public Administration in 1957; and the School of International Service in 1958.

In the early 1960s, the Department of Defense and the Central Intelligence Agency operated the FFRDC Special Operations Research Office as a think tank at American University. The government abandoned the think tank after its research was criticized as imperialistic by the general public. AU's political involvement was furthered by President John F. Kennedy's Spring 1963 commencement address. In the speech, Kennedy called on the Soviet Union to work with the United States to achieve a nuclear test ban treaty and to reduce the considerable international tensions and the specter of nuclear war during that juncture of the Cold War.

From 1965 to 1977, the College of Continuing Education existed as a degree-granting college responsible for on- and off-campus adult education programs. The Lucy Webb Hayes School of Nursing provided an undergraduate study in Nursing from 1965 until 1988. In 1972, the School of Government and Public Administration, the School of International Service, the Center for Technology and Administration, and the Center for the Administration of Justice (subsequently named the School of Justice) were incorporated into the College of Public and International Affairs.

The university bought the Immaculata Campus in 1986 to alleviate space problems. This would later become Tenley Campus.

In 1986, construction on the Adnan Khashoggi Sports and Convocation Center began. Financed with $5 million from and named for Saudi Arabian Trustee Adnan Khashoggi, the building was intended to update athletics facilities and provide a new arena, as well as a parking garage and office space for administrative services. Costing an estimated $19 million, the building represented the largest construction project to date but met protest by both faculty and students to the university's use of Khashoggi's name on the building due to his involvement in the international arms trade.

In 1988, the College of Public and International Affairs was reorganized to create two free-standing schools: the School of International Service and the School of Public Affairs, incorporating the School of Government and Public Administration and the School of Justice. That same year, construction on the Adnan Khashoggi Sports Center was completed while the Iran–Contra Affair controversy was at its height, although his name remained on the building until after Khashoggi defaulted on his donation obligation in the mid to late 1990s.

Present day (1990–)

The School of Communication became independent from the College of Arts and Sciences in 1993.

In 1997, American University of Sharjah, the only coeducational, liberal arts university in the United Arab Emirates, signed a two-year contract with AU to provide academic management. This contract has since been extended multiple times through August 2009. A team of senior AU administrators relocated to Sharjah to assist in the establishment of the university and guide it through the Middle States Association of Colleges and Schools accreditation process.

In fall 2005, the new Katzen Arts Center opened.

Benjamin Ladner was suspended from his position as president of the university on August 24, 2005, pending an investigation into possible misuse of university funds for his personal expenses. University faculty passed votes of no confidence in President Ladner on September 26. On October 10, 2005, the board of trustees of American University decided that Ladner would not return to American University as its president. Dr. Cornelius M. Kerwin, a long-time AU administrator, served as interim president and was appointed to the position permanently on September 1, 2007, after two outsiders declined an offer from the board of trustees. According to The Chronicle of Higher Education, Ladner received a total compensation of $4,270,665 in his final year of service, the second highest of any university president in the United States.

Ground was broken for the new School of International Service building on November 14, 2007, and completed in 2010. A speech was given by Senator Daniel K. Inouye (D-HI).

In 2015, American began to offer an accredited, accelerated online MBA program.

Neil Kerwin retired as AU's president at the end of May 2017. The current president is Sylvia Mathews Burwell whose tenure officially began on June 1, 2017.

As of the 2017–2018 academic year, a female tuxedo feral cat took up residence on the campus grounds near the McKinley School of Communications building. School students and staff maintain the cat's small shelter and feeding station and dubbed her "Wonk Cat". Wonk Cat has been adopted by the campus community at large, including in university social media postings and her own student-run social media sites. During the COVID-19 pandemic, Wonk cat went missing and has not been found to this day. Given the harsh winter conditions, abundance of drivers in the District of Columbia and general lifespan of cats, Wonk cat is believed to have passed away. 

In 2017, Taylor Dumpson became AU's first female black student body president. In her first full day in office, bananas were found at three places on campus, hanging from noose-like ropes, and marked with the initials "AKA", which are also the initials of the Alpha Kappa Alpha sorority.  The university considered the incident to be racist, and then-president Neil Kerwin called it a "cowardly, despicable act." In May 2018, the school said it had exhausted "all credible leads" about who had perpetrated the incident.

Also in May 2018, Dumpson filed a lawsuit against several people, including Andrew Anglin, the founder of the neo-Nazi website The Daily Stormer. She accused Anglin of organizing a racist and sexist trolling campaign against her. She alleged that Anglin posted her name, her picture, links to her Facebook page, and the Twitter page of the university's student government, and urged his readers to "troll storm" her, which resulted in many hate-filled and racist online messages directed at her. A federal judge ordered the defendants to pay more than $101,000 in compensatory damages, $500,000 in punitive damages, and more than $124,000 in attorney's fees. Dumpson also entered a restraining order against him. Although Dumpson and Anglin have not settled, she settled in December 2018 with one of the people who harassed her, a man from Oregon who was required to apologize, to renounce white supremacy, to stop trolling and doxing online, and to provide information to and cooperate with authorities in the prosecution of white supremacists.

In 2019, the School of Education (SOE) split from the College of Arts and Sciences. According to Cheryl Holcomb-McCoy (Dean of SOE) the move was made to "encourage more students to pursue careers in education". Areas of study that students can pursue within the school include: teacher education, special education, education policy, and leadership and international education. The school is home to the Institute for Innovation in Education and the newly created Center for Postsecondary Readiness and Success.

On April 22, 2020, AU announced that it had divested its endowment of fossil fuels, becoming one of the first universities in the United States to completely divest of both direct and indirect fossil fuel holdings. Following a student referendum in favor of divestment, the AU board of trustees voted against divesting the endowment in 2014. The decision to divest in 2020 came after extensive student campaigning from groups like Fossil Free AU and the undergraduate student government. In 2020, Fossil Free AU pushed for a second student referendum on the subject, and the student government released a report on divestment, presented to the board of trustees by student comptroller Robert Zitzmann.

Campuses

American University has two contiguous campuses for academics and student housing: the main campus on Massachusetts Avenue and the East Campus on Nebraska Avenue. The Washington College of Law has since been moved to the site of the Tenley Campus located in Tenleytown. Additionally, AU owns several other buildings in the Tenleytown, Spring Valley, the East Campus in Wesley Heights, and American University Park areas.

The first design for the campus was done by Frederick Law Olmsted. However, it was significantly modified over time due to financial constraints. The campus occupies  adjacent to Ward Circle, the intersection of Nebraska and Massachusetts Avenues. AU's campus is predominantly surrounded by the affluent residential neighborhoods characteristic of the Northwest quadrant of Washington, D.C. The campus includes a main quadrangle surrounded by academic buildings, nine residential halls, a 5,000-seat arena, and an outdoor amphitheater. The campus has been designated a public garden and arboretum by the American Public Gardens Association, with many foreign and exotic plants and trees dotting the landscape.

Academic and recreational buildings
 Abbey Joel Butler Pavilion: holds the campus store, the Office of Campus Life, the Career Center, and meeting spaces.
 Battelle-Tompkins Building: The university library until 1977 and now home to parts of the College of Arts and Sciences.
 Don Myers Technology and Innovation Building: Home to the physics, mathematics and statistics, computer science, the AU Game Lab, the Kogod Center for Innovation, and the Design and Build Lab; completed in 2017 and LEED Gold certified.
 Hall of Science: Home to the biology, environmental science, chemistry, and neuroscience departments; completed in 2020 and LEED Gold certified.

 Hurst Hall: First building of the university, ground was broken in 1896 for what was to be the College of History. The architects were Van Brunt & Howe. With the opening of the Hall of Science, the building now houses various departments and classrooms.
 Katzen Arts Center: Provided for by a monetary gift from Cyrus and Myrtle Katzen, the building opened in 2005 and is now home to the Departments of Performing Arts (such as dance), Studio Arts, Graphic Design, and Art History, the American University Museum, and other Academic Departments.

 Kay Spiritual Life Center: built in 1963 as a multi-denominational place of worship. Nicknamed the "flaming cupcake" due to its round shape and 16-foot-tall impressionistic flame top, Kay is home to offices of the university chaplains and is used for speeches, performances, and community events.
 Kerwin Hall: The largest classroom building on campus, built in 1968 as a home for the School of Government and Public Administration (now the School of Public Affairs).
 Kogod School of Business: Formerly known as the Myers-Hutchins Building, and previous home to the Washington College of Law. Construction finished in January 2009 to annex it to the now empty Experimental Theater and Butler Instructional Center.
 Mary Graydon Center: Commonly called MGC, it is the university's student union. Home to student organization offices, the main dining facilities, including the Terrace Dining Room (TDR) or "Tedes", The Bridge Coffee Shop, and is interconnected to Butler Pavilion.

 McKinley Building: Cornerstone laid by President Theodore Roosevelt. Was previously the home of the departments of Computer Science, Audio Technology, and Physics. After major renovations in 2014, it became the new home to the School of Communication; LEED Gold certified.

 School of International Service: Ground broken by President Dwight Eisenhower. The new building opened for the 2010–2011 school year, with classes continuing to be also held in the original building, which has since been renamed the "East Quad Building", next door. The School of International Service has an enrollment of over 2,000 undergraduate students and an enrollment of over 900 graduate students. The new building is LEED Gold certified.
 Sports Center: Bender Arena, Reeves Aquatic Center, Jacobs Fitness Center (see Athletics below)
 American University (Bender) Library, which holds over a million books.

Residence halls

Housing is guaranteed for two years. Most freshman and sophomore students choose to live on campus. First-year students are not required to live on campus.

The university added 590 beds in 2017 with the opening of East Campus. Residence halls on the main campus are grouped into three "campuses".

 North Campus, commonly referred to as "North Side":
 Hughes Hall
 Leonard Hall
 McDowell Hall
 Nebraska Hall, located across Massachusetts Avenue from the main campus. It features apartment-style residences of 2 to 4 bedrooms in a suite.
 Cassell Hall, opened for the Fall 2013 semester. This residence hall is equipped with a state of the art  fitness facility; LEED Silver certified.
 East Campus, completed construction in 2017, includes these LEED Gold certified, suite-style residence halls:
Duber Hall (formerly Congressional Hall)
Constitution Hall
Federal Hall
 South Campus, commonly referred to as "South Side":
 Anderson Hall, the largest first-year residence hall on campus.
 Centennial Hall, featuring suite-style living originally intended as housing for upperclassmen.
 Letts Hall, named after John C. Letts, university Trustee and President of the Board 1921–1931.
 Roper Hall, home to AU's Black Affinity Housing program.

Tenley Campus

Formerly the Immaculata School, Tenley Campus is located half a mile east of the main campus and was purchased by American University in 1987 specifically for the Washington Semester program. Tenley Campus used to be home to the Washington Semester and Washington Mentorship Program students, which featured housing primarily for international and transfer students. Before the construction of the new Washington College of Law, Tenley Campus was home to the main offices of: the School of Professional & Extended Studies, including the Washington Semester Program, University Marketing and Publications, and the Osher Lifelong Learning Institute. During the summer, the residence halls were used to house students in the Washington Semester - Summer Internship Program.

Since 2016, Tenley Campus has been home to American University's law school, the Washington College of Law. Over several years, former dormitory halls and academic buildings were torn down and replaced with many newer, more contemporary academic buildings that now house the Washington College of Law. The law school's reputation has fallen since construction began on the new campus. Graduates are reportedly saddled with enormous amounts of debt, and in 2014 only 42% of graduates held jobs that required they pass the Bar.

Recent construction projects
Spring 2014
 Renovation of McKinley Hall into a new home for the School of Communication
2013-Winter 2016
 Demolition of outdated buildings and dormitories on Tenley Campus and construction of new buildings to house the Washington College of Law
Summer 2014-Summer 2017
 Construction of new East Campus development across Nebraska Avenue, composed of three residence halls (Constitution, Duber, and Federal Halls) and one connected academic building (Don Myers Technology and Innovation Building); all buildings are LEED Gold certified.
Winter 2018-Spring 2020
 Replacement of steam lines across campus to reduce carbon emissions and energy consumption. AU achieved carbon neutrality in 2018, becoming the first university in the United States to do so.
 Construction of new Hall of Science building on a former parking lot on South Side of campus; on track to receive LEED Gold certification.
Fall 2020-Present
 Addition of the "Marabar" art exhibit on a part of campus near the main entrance on Massachusetts Avenue. The project required the relocation of several stones from the National Geographic Society headquarters in September 2022, with each stone weighing over 250,000 pounds and requiring multiple trips through Washington, D.C. to reach AU's campus.

Academics

The university is composed of eight divisions, referred to as colleges or schools, which house its academic programs. Except for WCL, undergraduate and graduate courses are housed within the same division, although organized into different programs.

American University is also home to a unique program known as the Washington Semester Program. This program partners with institutions around the world to bring students to AU for a semester. The program operates as part of the School of Professional & Extended Studies. The program combines two seminar courses three days a week with a two-day-per-week internship that gives students a unique look at Washington, D.C. The program is unique because the courses are not typical lecture courses; instead, speakers from various sectors of a particular field are invited to address the class, often from different perspectives.

In the Chronicle of Higher Education survey of college presidents' salaries for 2007–08, President Cornelius M. Kerwin was fifth highest in the nation with a compensation of $1.4 million.

Admissions and student demographics

Admission to American is considered to be "more selective" by the U.S. News & World Report. For the Class of 2023 (enrolling fall 2019), AU received 18,545 freshmen applications; 6,691 were admitted (36%) and 1,755 enrolled. The middle 50% range of SAT scores were 590–690 for Evidence-Based Reading and Writing and 590–690 for Math. The middle 50% range of the ACT Composite score was 27–31.

Study abroad 
The U.S. News & World Report has ranked American University 7th in Study Abroad programs. American University operates three premier programs in Brussels, Belgium; Madrid, Spain; and Nairobi, Kenya but, also partners with universities across the globe. Students can study abroad for a semester or a year or with programs available at the London School of Economics, Peking University, University of Warwick, Freie University Berlin, Yonsei University, Sorbonne University, Sciences Po and the Balsillie School of International Affairs.

Rankings

American University's undergraduate program was tied for 76th overall among "national universities" in U.S. News & World Report 2021 rankings, tied for 25th in "Best Undergraduate Teaching", tied for 35th in "Most Innovative Schools", and 82nd in "Best Value Schools".

In 2008, 2010, 2012, and 2018, American University was named the most politically active school in the nation by The Princeton Reviews annual survey of college students. In 2006, the Fiske Guide to Colleges ranked AU as a "Best Buy" college for the quality of academic offerings in relation to the cost of attendance. However, in 2013, the Daily Beast listed the school in their list of "20 Least Affordable Colleges". For two years in a row, American University has had more students chosen to receive Presidential Management Fellowships than any other college or university in the country. In spring 2006, 34 graduate and law students were chosen for the honor. American University routinely ranks among the top mid-sized universities for producing Peace Corps volunteers.

Among The Association of Professional Schools of International Affairs (APSIA) schools, AU School of International Service has the largest number of minority students and female students. It is ranked 6th among APSIA schools in numbers of international students. A review in Foreign Policy Magazine ranked the school 8th in the country for preparing future foreign policy professionals and 25th for academic careers. SIS's undergraduate programs earned a spot at number 11, and its graduate programs were ranked number 8. Because the field of international relations is not evaluated by U.S. News & World Report, the College of William and Mary recently published the results of their survey, which ranked the AU international relations master's degree in the top 10 in the United States and the doctoral degree in the top 25. The School of Communication is among the top 25 in the nation, and it graduates the third-largest number of communication professionals among U.S. colleges and universities. The School of Public Affairs is ranked 13th in the U.S. by U.S. News & World Report for 2020.

The cross-campus American University Center for Innovation (AUCI) was recognized the Association to Advance Collegiate Schools of Business (AACSB) as one of the world's top twenty entrepreneurship centers in April 2017. At the undergraduate level, AUCI offers an entrepreneurship minor for all university majors and a specialization for business school students.

Folio literary magazine

Folio is a literary magazine founded in 1984 and based at American University. It publishes fiction, poetry, and creative nonfiction twice each year. Folio is also known for interviews with prominent writers, most recently Ann Beattie, Alice Fulton, Leslie Pietrzyk, Gregory Orr, and Adam Haslett. Work that has appeared in Folio was short-listed for the Pushcart Prize multiple time in the 1980s. Among the notable stories that first appeared in Folio are Jacob M. Appel's "Fata Morgana" and "Becoming Coretta Davis" by I. Bennett Capers.

Sine Institute
On September 24, 2018, AU President Sylvia M. Burwell announced the Sine Institute of Policy and Politics'''. Taking advantage of AU's location in the nation's capital, the institute will bring together scholars, journalists, and experts from the public, private, and nonprofit sectors to find common ground and bipartisan policy solutions to the nation's problems. The Sine Institute launched with a conversation between Burwell and Republican Senator Bob Corker of Tennessee. Amy K. Dacey is the first and current executive director of the Sine Institute.

Library system

The Jack I. and Dorothy G. Bender Library and Learning Resources Center is the main library facility for the campus. A branch Music Library is located in the Katzen Art Center. The Pence Law Library, part of AU's Washington College of Law, operates separately from the main library system. The University Library is part of the Washington Research Library Consortium (WRLC), which includes seven other libraries. The WRLC operates a consortium loan service between member institutions and has a shared collections site in Upper Marlboro, Maryland.

The Bender Library provides various individual and group study spaces. It includes a Curriculum Materials Center, a New Media Center, Graduate Research Center, and classrooms. About 160 public computer workstations are available throughout the Bender building. Researchers also may borrow laptops, chargers, tablets, and other electronic devices. In October 2012, the library acquired a large poster printer which researchers may use for presentations and other academic purposes.

The Library's Archives and Special Collections houses unique and rare materials and information on the institution's history. The University Archives is the repository for papers and other documents, including sound recordings and photographs, spanning more than a century of the university's history. Special Collections houses rare materials. Among the more important holdings are the Artemas Martin collection of mathematical texts, the Charles Nelson Spinks collection of artistic and historical works of Japan, the Irwin M. Heine collection of literary works, and Christopher Johnson collection of William Faulkner books. Playbills form a significant set of the collections, with the James Carroll and Iris Lipkowitz collections most notable among them. Other significant collections include the Barlett & Steele Archive, the John R. Hickman Collection, the Friends of Colombia Archives, the Records of the National Peace Corps Association, the Records of the National Commission on the Public Service, the Sally L. Smith Papers, and the Records of Women Strike for Peace.

Campus life
AU has over 150 recognized organizations on campus, ranging from political and social. The Student Union Board (SUB), a part of the Student Government, is AU's oldest student-run organization. Since 1963, the SUB has arranged big name concerts and live entertainment for AU. Acts have ranged from the Grateful Dead to Ben Folds. Past acts include Chance The Rapper, Lupe Fiasco, Bob Dylan, Nirvana, Red Hot Chili Peppers, Andrew W.K., Phantom Planet, Everclear, Ben Kweller, Jimmy Eat World, Paramore, Stephen Lynch, Jim Gaffigan, Snow Patrol, Ghostface Killah, Ted Leo and the Pharmacists, Blackalicious, Metro Boomin, and Hayley Kiyoko. SUB also screens free second-run movies for the AU community, known as SUB Cinema.

American University also has an internationally top-ranked Model United Nations team (ranking 1st in North America following the 2021-2022 academic year). The team competes actively at intercollegiate tournaments, and also hosts "AmeriMUNC" (American Model United Nations Conference) a yearly High School Model UN competition on campus.

AU has eight student-run university-recognized media organizations, including The Eagle'' newspaper, radio station WVAU, the Second District Records record label, the American Literary Magazine (AmLit), and several magazines. These media organizations are governed by a Student Media Board and are funded through the university's undergraduate student activity fee:

Feminist identity 
American University's feminist student-run clubs include AUSG Women's Initiative (WI), the first-generation women student-run organization which "advocates for AU by creating responsive programming addressing gender & sexuality based issues." Another is Sister Sister AU. The mission is described as "building a community for women of the African Diaspora at American University." Black Girls Vote is "dedicated to the engagement, education, and empowerment of collegiate women through the electoral process."

American University's institutional feminist organizations include the Women and Politics Institute in the School of Public Affairs. The institute announces its mission on its website as "to close the gender gap in political leadership and provide young women with academic and practical training that encourages them to become involved in the political process and facilitates research by faculty and students that enhances their understanding of the challenges and opportunities women face in the political arena." The department of Women's, Gender, and Sexuality Studies (WGSS) within the College of Arts and Sciences is "an interdisciplinary program encompassing feminist studies, masculinity studies, and sexuality studies. The program is committed to a multicultural curriculum that sustains and integrates diverse perspectives." Students who major or minor in WGSS gain experience off-campus through an internship placement in an organization or agency whose mission embraces some aspect of women's/gender/sexuality studies. WGSS has both undergraduate programs and graduate programs.

American University's discrimination and sexual harassment policy regarding Title IX rights is "to prohibit sex- or gender-based harassment and discrimination, sexual violence, relationship violence, and stalking. American University is committed to creating an accessible and inclusive environment for all students and employees."  AU's Office of Advocacy Services for Interpersonal and Sexual Violence (OASIS) "provides free and confidential victim advocacy services for American University students who are impacted by all forms of sexual violence either directly or indirectly."  The Center for Diversity and Inclusion (CDI) is dedicated to enhancing LGBTQ, multicultural, first-generation, and women's experiences on campus.

AU is also home to several women suffragist alumni such as Alice Paul, one of the prominent leaders and strategists of the suffrage campaign. In 1896, The Washington College of Law was founded for women. In 1915, 5 of AU's first 28 students were women.

Religious life
While AU is affiliated with the United Methodist Church and hosts the AU United Methodist Community, AU has a variety of other religious life groups, including Catholic, Chabad Lubavitch of the AU Community, American University Hillel, and the Jewish Student Association.

Greek life
American University has a Panhellenic Association (PHA), Interfraternity Council (IFC), National Pan-Hellenic Council (NPHC), and Multicultural Greek Council (MGC). There are also several independent organizations.

Sustainability
In 2008, American University joined more than 500 other US universities in signing the American College and University Presidents Climate Commitment, demonstrating the university's commitment to environmental responsibility. Within a year, American University's Office of Sustainability was established. In 2010, American University adopted a zero-waste policy and released its first climate action plan, with the goal of achieving carbon neutrality by 2020.

An environmental science class at American conducted a study from February to April 2009 to measure the amount of food waste avoided by eliminating trays from one of the college's dining halls. The class found that trayless dinners resulted in 47.1% less solid waste than dinners during which trays were used, spurring a student-driven campaign to go trayless across campus.

In 2011, the Association for the Advancement of Sustainability in Higher Education (AASHE) awarded American University a gold rating, the highest possible, on their STARS scale for sustainability. Since then, American University has earned five consecutive gold ratings, the most recent in 2020.

Also in 2011, American University's School of International Service building earned Leadership in Energy and Environmental Design (LEED) Gold certification for its 70,000 square foot building renowned for sustainable design and "cradle-to-cradle" philosophy.

In 2014, American University ranked #2 in the Sierra Club's list of the 'Top 10 Greenest Colleges'.

In 2014, the university announced an ambitious project to build a solar farm in partnership with George Washington University. , the completed solar farm provides an equivalent of 50% of the university's electricity.

In 2018, American University became the first university in the United States to achieve carbon-neutral status.

In 2020, American University announced that it had eliminated all public fossil fuel investments from its endowment.

Athletics

A member of the Patriot League, AU has several sports teams including men's and women's basketball, soccer, cross-country, swimming and diving, track, women's volleyball, field hockey, and lacrosse, and men's wrestling. Club sports, such as tennis, rugby, rowing, ice hockey, field hockey, equestrian and ultimate frisbee also have teams. AU's football team had their last season in 1941.

Bender Arena, a multi-purpose facility, hosts many of American's athletic competitions. Bender Arena opened on January 23, 1988, when AU's women's basketball team hosted James Madison University.

Reeves Field, home to AU's soccer team, earned the 2002 College Soccer Field of the Year by the Sports Turf Managers Association, hosted its fifth NCAA Tournament game, and served as the training site for the Uruguay national football team. Reeves Field features a six-lane track to accommodate the track and field programs at AU and functions as a multi-purpose event site. 

American University has seven tennis courts and two basketball courts in the outdoor recreational facility located next to Reeves Field and behind Bender Arena. AU has hosted Patriot League tennis team championships three times since joining the league. Both the men's and women's tennis teams have been cut from the athletics program.

On March 14, 2008, AU earned its first NCAA tournament berth in men's basketball by defeating Colgate University in the Patriot League Championship Game. However, AU lost its first-round NCAA tournament game against the University of Tennessee. On March 13, 2009, AU's men's basketball team repeated as Patriot League Champion by defeating Holy Cross 73–57, earning an automatic bid to the NCAA Men's Division I Basketball Championship. They ultimately lost to Villanova University in the first round on March 19, 2009, with a final score of 80–67.

William I Jacobs Recreational Complex is also located on campus, containing an AstroTurf surface, a softball diamond, and two sand volleyball courts.

Off-campus facilities include the Massachusetts Ave. Field, which hosts intramural and varsity athletic practices for both the Men's and Women's soccer teams.

The Marilyn Meltzer Wrestling Room is located within Jacobs Fitness Center, and hosts practices for the Men's Varsity Wrestling Team at American University.

Notable people

References

External Links
 
 

 
1893 establishments in Washington, D.C.
American University Park
Arboreta in Washington, D.C.
Articles containing video clips
Educational institutions established in 1893
Patriot League schools
Private universities and colleges in Washington, D.C.
Universities and colleges affiliated with the United Methodist Church